Ust-Altasha (Altashyn Adag) is a rural locality (an ulus) in Mukhorshibirsky District, Republic of Buryatia, Russia. The population was 200 as of 2010. There are 5 streets.

Geography 
Ust-Altasha is located 65 km west of Mukhorshibir (the district's administrative centre) by road. Zurgan-Debe is the nearest rural locality.

References 

Rural localities in Mukhorshibirsky District